Spital railway station is a railway station serving the village of Spital in Merseyside, England. The station is located on the Wirral Line operated by Merseyrail and there are frequent third rail electric train services to Liverpool, Chester and Ellesmere Port.

Facilities
The station is staffed, during all opening hours, and has platform CCTV. There is a payphone, a vending machine and a booking office. There are departure and arrival screens on the platforms for passenger information. Each of the two platforms has sheltered seating. The station has a car park, with 141 spaces, a cycle rack with 14 spaces, and a secure cycle locker with 30 spaces. Access to the station booking office is straightforward. There is no easy access for passengers with wheelchairs or prams to the platforms, as this is by staircase only.

Services
Trains run to Liverpool at a frequency of approximately every 10 minutes and a service to Chester every 15 minutes on weekdays and Saturdays until late evening when the service to each destination becomes half-hourly, as it is on Sundays. Additionally there is a half-hourly service to Ellesmere Port all day, every day. Northbound trains operate via Hamilton Square station in Birkenhead and the Mersey Railway Tunnel to Liverpool. Southbound trains all proceed as far as Hooton, where the lines to Chester and Ellesmere Port divide. These services are all provided by Merseyrail's fleet of Class 507 and Class 508 EMUs.

Gallery

References

Further reading

External links 

Railway stations in the Metropolitan Borough of Wirral
DfT Category E stations
Former Birkenhead Railway stations
Railway stations in Great Britain opened in 1840
Railway stations served by Merseyrail